Subašić is a Bosnian, Serbian, and Croatian surname. Notable people with the surname include:

 Branimir Subašić (born 1982), Serbian born footballer
 Danijel Subašić (born 1984), Croatian football goalkeeper
 Muhamed Subašić (born 1988), Bosnian footballer
 Zijad Subašić (died 1992), Bosnian resistance leader

See also
 Šubašić

Croatian surnames
Serbian surnames
Slavic-language surnames
Patronymic surnames